Maury "Bodie" Bodenger (1909-1960) was a professional American football player who played offensive lineman for three seasons for the Portsmouth Spartans/Detroit Lions. He played college football at Tulane, where he earned All-Southern honors. He was Jewish.

References

External links

1909 births
1960 deaths
American football offensive linemen
Portsmouth Spartans players
Detroit Lions players
Tulane Green Wave football players
Jewish American sportspeople
All-Southern college football players
20th-century American Jews